VTM may refer to:

 Nevatim Airbase (IATA code: VTM), an Israeli Air Force base located southeast of Be'er Sheva, near moshav Nevatim
 Telecom Enforcement Resource and Monitoring (previously Vigilance Telecom Monitoring), the vigilance and monitoring wing of the Indian Department of Telecommunications
 Vampire: The Masquerade, a series of games including both tabletop and video games
 Variable Torque Management, a redesigned four-wheel-drive transmission designed by Honda Advanced Technology
 Vetapalem railway station (station code: VTM), Andhra Pradesh, India
 Victor Talking Machine Company
 Viral transport medium, a substance used to preserve and transport virus samples
 VTM (TV channel), or Vlaamse Televisie Maatschappij, the main commercial television station in Flanders
 VVC Test Model; see Versatile Video Coding, a proposed video compression standard